"One Takes the Blame" is a song written by Don Reid, and recorded by American country music group The Statler Brothers.  It was released in July 1984 as the second single from their album Atlanta Blue.  The song peaked at number 8 on the Billboard Hot Country Singles chart.

Chart performance

References

1984 singles
The Statler Brothers songs
Mercury Nashville singles
Song recordings produced by Jerry Kennedy
Songs written by Don Reid (singer)
1984 songs